Darrick Bachman is an American television writer born in Glendale, California. He has worked on such animated programs as Foster's Home for Imaginary Friends, Chowder, Sym-Bionic Titan, Mickey Mouse, the fifth season of Samurai Jack and Primal. He won two consecutive Primetime Emmy Awards in 2004 and 2005 for his work on Star Wars: Clone Wars and another win in 2009 for the Foster's Home for Imaginary Friends TV-movie Destination: Imagination. He has been nominated for three additional Primetime Emmys, two Annie Awards, and one Daytime Emmy Award.

Filmography

Accolades

References

External links
 

American male screenwriters
Living people
1969 births
American male television writers
Primetime Emmy Award winners
American television writers
Cartoon Network Studios people